This article presents a list of the historical events and publications of Australian literature during 1895.

Books 

 Guy Boothby
 A Bid for Fortune; Or, Doctor Nikola's Vendetta
 A Lost Endeavour
 The Marriage of Esther: A Torres Strait Sketch
 Ada Cambridge – Fidelis: A Novel
 Henry Kingsley – Reginald Hetherage and Leighton Court
 Rosa Praed – Mrs Tregaskiss: A Novel of Anglo-Australian Life
 Ethel Turner 
 The Family at Misrule
 The Story of a Baby

Short stories 

 Edward Dyson 
 "After the Accident"
 "Dead Man's Lode"
 "The Trucker's Dream"
 "A Visit to Scubby Gully"
 Ernest Favenc – "The Boundary Rider's Story"
 Mary Fortune – "The Major's Case"
 Henry Lawson – "Steelman's Pupil"
 A. B. Paterson – "Concerning a Dog Fight"
 Steele Rudd
 "Our First Harvest"
 "Starting the Selection"
 "When the Wolf Was at the Door"

Poetry 

 Jennings Carmichael – Poems
 Daniel Henry Deniehy – "Amans Amare"
 Edward Dyson
 "Bullocky Bill and His Old Red Team"
 "When Brother Peetree Prayed: A Recollection"
 Henry Lawson – "The Vagabond"
 Louise Mack – "Of a Wild White Bird"
 John Shaw Neilson – "Marian's Child"
 Will H. Ogilvie 
 "From the Gulf"
 "Northward to the Sheds"
 A. B. Paterson 
 "Brumby's Run"
 The Man from Snowy River and Other Verses
 "Waltzing Matilda"

Births 

A list, ordered by date of birth (and, if the date is either unspecified or repeated, ordered alphabetically by surname) of births in 1895 of Australian literary figures, authors of written works or literature-related individuals follows, including year of death.

 15 November – Leonard Mann, poet and novelist (died 1981)

Unknown date
 Victor Kennedy, poet (died 1952)

Deaths 

A list, ordered by date of death (and, if the date is either unspecified or repeated, ordered alphabetically by surname) of deaths in 1895 of Australian literary figures, authors of written works or literature-related individuals follows, including year of birth.

 21 October – Louisa Anne Meredith, poet (born 1812)

See also 
 1895 in poetry
 List of years in literature
 List of years in Australian literature
 1895 in literature
 1894 in Australian literature
 1895 in Australia
 1896 in Australian literature

References

Literature
Australian literature by year
19th-century Australian literature
1895 in literature